Events from the year 1519 in France

Incumbents
 Monarch – Francis I

Events
University of Auvergne established

Births
 
17 February – Francis, Duke of Guise, soldier and politician (died 1563)
2 July – François de Noailles, diplomat (died 1585)

Full date missing
Theodore Beza, Protestant reformer (died 1605).
Matthieu Cointerel, cardinal (died 1585)

Deaths
27 November – Antoine Bohier Du Prat, bishop (born c.1460)
2 May – Leonardo da Vinci, bishop (born 1452)

Full date missing
Philippe de Luxembourg, cardinal (born 1445)
René de Prie, bishop (born 1451)

See also

References

1510s in France